This is a list of the mayors and lord mayors of City of Parramatta Council and its predecessors, a local government area of New South Wales, Australia. The official title of lord mayors while holding office is: The Right Worshipful Lord Mayor of Parramatta. The current lord mayor is Councillor Donna Davis (Labor), who was elected on 10 January 2022.

Development of the office
First incorporated in January 1861 as the "Municipality of Parramatta", the council became known as the "Borough of Parramatta" on 23 December 1867 following the enactment of the Municipalities Act, 1867, and became a Municipality again following the 1906 Local Government Act. On 27 October 1938, the Local Government (City of Parramatta) Act was passed by the Parliament of New South Wales and proclaimed by the Governor, Lord Wakehurst, making the town the "City of Parramatta".

From 1 January 1949 the "City of Parramatta" was re-formed following the passing of the Local Government (Areas) Act 1948, when the councils of Ermington and Rydalmere (incorporated 1891), Dundas (incorporated 1889) and Granville (incorporated 1885) were merged into the council area. The Department of Local Government refused requests from Parramatta in 1948 and 1949 to be granted the title of "Lord Mayor".

In recognition of the town of Parramatta's bicentennial (coinciding with Australia's Bicentenary), the title of "Lord Mayor" was granted on 12 December 1988 by Queen Elizabeth II on the recommendation of Premier Nick Greiner. This made Parramatta the third Australian city that was not a capital to receive such an honour, after Newcastle and Wollongong.

A 2015 review of local government boundaries by the NSW Government Independent Pricing and Regulatory Tribunal recommended that the City of Parramatta be reformed, adding areas from several adjoining councils. The NSW Government subsequently proposed a merger of parts of Parramatta (Woodville Ward), Auburn and Holroyd and a second merger of parts of the rest of Parramatta and parts of Auburn, The Hills, Hornsby, and Holroyd to form a new council.

On 12 May 2016, Parramatta City Council was abolished by the NSW Government. Parts of Auburn City Council (south of the M4 Western Motorway) and Parramatta City Council (Woodville Ward), and Holroyd City Council merged to form the Cumberland Council as a new local government area and the remainder of the Parramatta City Council, Auburn City Council north of the M4 Western Motorway (including parts of the Sydney Olympic Park), and small parts of Hornsby Shire, Holroyd and The Hills Shire were merged into the reformed "City of Parramatta Council".

List of incumbents

Mayors of the Municipality/Borough/Municipality/City of Parramatta, 1861–1948

Mayors/Lord mayors of the City of Parramatta, 1949–2016

Lord mayors of the City of Parramatta Council, 2016–date

Notes and references

Further reading

External links
 City of Parramatta Council (Council website)

Parramatta
Mayors Parramatta
 
Parramatta